Robert Donell Nixon (born December 31, 1961) is an American former professional baseball outfielder. He played all or part of four seasons in the Major League Baseball (MLB), from  until , playing all three outfield positions, most often in center field.

Playing career

Mariners organization

Minor leagues 
Nixon was drafted by the Seattle Mariners in the 10th round of the 1980 MLB draft out of West Columbus High School in Cerro Gordo, North Carolina. He began his professional career the following season with the Wausau Timbers of the Single-A Midwest League. He spent most of the next two seasons at Single-A as well. In , while with the Bakersfield Mariners Nixon stole 144 bases in just 135 games, one short of the minor league record of 145 by Vince Coleman set the same year.

In , Nixon was promoted to the Double-A Chattanooga Lookouts, where he continued to impress on the basepaths, stealing 102 bases. The injury cost him almost 2 years of his career but did not take away much of his speed. He ran a 6.25 sixty-yard dash prior to the injury and a 6.3 after.

Major league debut 
He started the season's first game as Seattle's center fielder and leadoff hitter, coming to the plate four times with two walks and one stolen base. Although he continued to start for the Mariners, Nixon did not get his first hit until the season's fifth game, a run-scoring double off Les Straker. On May 1, with Nixon batting just .130, he was sent back to the minors, where he played for the Triple-A Calgary Cannons, the Mariners' top farm team. He returned to the team in July, and finished with a much more respectable .250 average.

Nixon opened the 1988 season with Calgary, where he batted .281 through 40 games. He was then traded to the San Francisco Giants on June 23.

Giants organization 
The Giants immediately added Nixon to the major league roster. He played in 59 games over the remainder of the season, batting .348. He spent the entire 1989 season with the Giants, the only season in which he did not play in the minor leagues. He made his only postseason appearances in 1989 as well, playing in two games of the 1989 World Series against the Oakland Athletics, recording one hit in five at bats. The following year, the Giants released Nixon at the end of spring training.

Orioles organization 
Eight days after his release by the Giants, Nixon signed with the Baltimore Orioles. He spent most of the season with the Triple-A Rochester Red Wings, although he did appear in eight games for the Orioles in late June and early July. After the season, Nixon became a free agent.

Indians organization 
Nixon spent the last three years of his playing career in the Cleveland Indians organization, but Nixon never returned to the major leagues.

Personal 
Nixon is the younger brother of Otis Nixon, who is also a former MLB outfielder.

Notes

External links 

Baseball Gauge
Retrosheet
Venezuela Winter League

1961 births
Living people
African-American baseball players
American expatriate baseball players in Canada
Bakersfield Mariners players
Baltimore Orioles players
Baseball players from North Carolina
Calgary Cannons players
Canton-Akron Indians players
Charlotte Knights players
Chattanooga Lookouts players
Colorado Springs Sky Sox players
Leones del Caracas players
American expatriate baseball players in Venezuela
Louisburg Hurricanes baseball players
Lynn Sailors players
Major League Baseball center fielders
Rochester Red Wings players
San Francisco Giants players
Seattle Mariners players
Wausau Timbers players
21st-century African-American people
20th-century African-American sportspeople
People from Columbus County, North Carolina